Leroy Eliot "Slam" Stewart (September 21, 1914December 10, 1987) was an American jazz double bass player, whose trademark style was his ability to bow the bass (arco) and simultaneously hum or sing an octave higher. He was a violinist before switching to bass at the age of 20.

Biography

Stewart was born in Englewood, New Jersey, United States and began playing string bass while attending Dwight Morrow High School. While attending the Boston Conservatory, he heard Ray Perry singing along with his violin. This gave him the inspiration to follow suit with his bass. In 1937, Stewart teamed with Slim Gaillard to form the novelty jazz act Slim and Slam. The duo's biggest hit was "Flat Foot Floogie (with a Floy Floy)" in 1938.

Stewart found regular session work throughout the 1940s with Lester Young, Fats Waller, Coleman Hawkins, Erroll Garner, Art Tatum, Johnny Guarnieri, Red Norvo, Don Byas, Benny Goodman, and Beryl Booker. One of the most famous sessions he played on took place in 1945, when Stewart played with Dizzy Gillespie's group (which featured Charlie Parker).  Out of those sessions came some of the classics of bebop such as "Groovin' High" and "Dizzy Atmosphere".

He taught at Binghamton University in Binghamton, New York, and at Yale University. He died of congestive heart failure on December 10, 1987, in Binghamton, aged 73.

Discography

Studio albums
 Slam Stewart (1946)
 Slam Bam (1971)
 Slamboree (1972)
 Fish Scales (1975)
 Two Big Mice (1977)
 Dialogue (1978)
 Shut Yo' Mouth! (1981) with Major Holley
 The Cats Are Swingin'  (1987)

As sideman
  Slipped Disc, 1945–46 (1990, Benny Goodman Sextet)
  Art Tatum Live 1951–1953 Volume 6 (2004)
  Big Joe Turner, Texas Style (Black and Blue, 1971)

Filmography
Hellzapoppin' (1941)
Almost Married (1942)
Boy! What a Girl! (1947)

References

External links
[|Slam Stewart at AllMusic]
Audio of Slam Stuart improvising at a 1970 Binghamton Symphony concert
A Slam Stewart Biography
www.myspace.com/slamstewart - Fan page with music, videos, more
Slam Stewart and other jazz musicians on Don Gabor's Continental Records
Slam Stewart solo transcription on "I Got Rhythm" at Back Beat Magazine

1914 births
1987 deaths
American jazz bandleaders
American jazz double-bassists
Male double-bassists
Boston Conservatory at Berklee alumni
American jazz composers
American male jazz composers
Musicians from New Jersey
Dwight Morrow High School alumni
People from Englewood, New Jersey
Savoy Records artists
Swing double-bassists
Manor Records artists
20th-century American composers
Binghamton University faculty
20th-century double-bassists
20th-century American male musicians
Slim & Slam members
Black & Blue Records artists
20th-century jazz composers
20th-century African-American musicians